The fourth season of Ellen, an American television series, began September 17, 1996 and ended on May 13, 1997. It aired on ABC. The region 1 DVD was released on September 26, 2006. This season is most famous for "The Puppy Episode" outing the fictional Ellen Morgan, which aired on the same day Ellen DeGeneres came out on Oprah. Almost every episode beforehand contained several hints.

Cast

Main Cast
 Ellen DeGeneres as Ellen Morgan
 Joely Fisher as Paige Clark
 David Anthony Higgins as Joe Farrell
 Clea Lewis as Audrey Penney
 Jeremy Piven as Spence Kovak

Episodes

References

1996 American television seasons
1997 American television seasons
Ellen (TV series) seasons